Smetana (or smotana, polish: śmietana) is a type of sour cream from Central and Eastern Europe. It is a dairy product produced by souring heavy cream. It is similar to crème fraîche (28% fat), but nowadays mainly sold with 9% to 42% milkfat content depending on the country. Its cooking properties are different from crème fraîche and the lighter sour creams sold in the US, which contain 12 to 16% butterfat. It is widely used in cooking and baking.

Uses and distribution

Smetana is also used in other central Central and Eastern European cuisines in appetizers, main courses, soups and desserts. For example, it may be blended with soups, vegetable salads, cole slaw, and meat dishes. It is served with dumplings (pelmeni, pierogi, varenyky), or with pancakes (bliny, palacsinta, naleśniki, oladyi, syrniki). It is also used as a filling in savoury pancakes. Smetana can be blended to a Liptauer-like cheese spread with quark or cottage cheeses, onions, paprika and other spices, and eaten with bread. Smetana is often used in cooking, as it is high enough in fat not to curdle at higher temperatures. It is used in the preparation of meat stews, such as beef Stroganoff, vegetable stews, casseroles, or other dishes that require a long cooking time in the oven. Smetana does not melt in the oven. Hungarian cooks use it as an ingredient in sauces such as paprikas, and in recipes such as palacsinta (crepes) filled with ham or minced meat (hortobágyi palacsinta). (Similar usages are common in Eastern European Jewish cuisines, save that smetana is not used with meat dishes due to traditional Jewish dietary restrictions on mixing dairy products with meat.) 

The current trend toward reduced fat content is believed to have resulted in an inferior product. To imitate Hungarian-style cooking and the use of smetana (called tejföl in Hungarian), Hungarian cookbooks recommend using Western sour cream mixed with heavy whipping cream (38–40% milkfat). Unlike sour cream mixed with whipping cream, smetana is not a homogenized product.

In Central European countries, such as the Czech Republic, Slovakia and Poland, smetana may refer to sweet cream or soured cream. It should contain at least 10% fat. Smetana that has at least 30% fat is called smetana ke šlehání (whipping cream) and is used for the production of šlehačka (whipped cream).

In Ukrainian, Belarusian and Russian cuisines, sour cream is often added to borscht and other soups, and is used as a salad dressing and as a condiment for dumplings, such as varenyky and pelmeni. In Polish cuisine smetana can be added to the traditional pierogi dumplings. It is also used in gravies served with Bohemian (Czech) cuisine, such as marinated beef svíčková. In Slovak cuisine, smotana (cognate of smetana) is often incorporated into Bryndzové halušky and Pierogi.

Schmand mit Glumse (whipped cream with quark) is used in Prussian and other Germanic cuisines. Of note, it is not only used in savory dishes, but also for cakes called Schmandkuchen and desserts. A German medical book published in 1677 recommended Schmant or Milchraam as the best part of the milk. Schmand is the cream of the milk, or the foam that rises up, like the white on the beer. Schmand or Schmant also describes other fatty foamy material and is known as a byproduct of mining (Grubenschmant) for example in vitriol development. The Balkan name for fattier varieties of Smetana, mileram is probably a variation of the earlier Bavarian name for the product Millirahm meaning "milk cream".

When comparing brands or suppliers of smetana, the Polish and Russian practice is to compare the fat content of the varieties. Fat content can range from 10% (runny) to 70% (thick). The most common supermarket smetana is 10% to 40% fat (milk fat only for an authentic product). The addition of thickeners such as gelatine is not forbidden by relevant regulations, so today one hardly can find real, thickener-free smetana in an ordinary shop, which is regarded by discriminating buyers as cheating and the product is considered substandard and unsuitable for culinary use, since some recipes are easily spoiled by the presence of a thickener. Farmer's smetana should be used instead.

Etymology
The word smetana comes from the common Slavic "sъmętana", in turn from the verb "sъmětati" - to remove, to dump. Under this name, this product has spread in most languages: in Russia (смета́на “smyetana”) and Ukraine (смета́на “smetana”), Belarus (смята́на, “smyatana / śmiatana”), Finland (“smetana” and “crème fraîche”). In German, smetana is called "saure Sahne", "Schmand"; Armenian (թթվասեր "t't'vaser"), Slovenian "kisla smetana", Polish "śmietana" Bulgarian (заквасена сметана "zakvasena smetana"), Slovak "smotana", Czech "zakysaná smetana", Romanian "smântână".

In Finland, the name "smetana" is used only for a product with a high fat content (30% or more), while ordinary smetana is called "hapankerma" ("sour cream").

Smântână 

Smântână is a Romanian dairy product that is produced by separating the milk fat through decantation  and retaining the cream. It will not curdle when cooked or if added to hot dishes. Smântână's taste is tangy and sweet; soured smântână is considered spoiled. 

The word is a cognate with Slavic smetana (Czech: "cream", Russian: "sour cream").

Smântână is widely used in Romanian cuisine, particularly in appetizers, main courses, soups and desserts. It is often added to ciorbă and other soups, and is used as a condiment for mămăligă and dishes like sarmale.

See also

 Crème fraîche
 Kajmak
 List of English words of Russian origin
 Strained yogurt
 List of dips

References

External links

Fermented dairy products
Pavlaka
Croatian cuisine
Czech cuisine
Slovak cuisine
Hungarian cuisine
Montenegrin cuisine
Russian cuisine
Serbian cuisine
Lithuanian cuisine
Slavic cuisine
Romanian sauces
Slovenian cuisine
Ashkenazi Jewish cuisine
Bulgarian cuisine
ro:Smântână